Dyschirius breviphthalmus is a species of ground beetle in the subfamily Scaritinae. It was described by Balkenohl & Lompe in 2003.

References

breviphthalmus
Beetles described in 2003